The 2003 European Athletics Indoor Cup was held on 15 February 2003 at the Arena Leipzig in Leipzig, Germany. It was the inaugural edition of the indoor track and field meeting for international teams, which featured the eight top performing nations from the 2002 European Cup. The event was held before a sell-out crowd of 3069 people and athletes gave a positive reaction to the competition, with 60 metres winner Jason Gardener remarking that "The public, the organisation and the facilities are very good here". This reception led to Leipzig being awarded the hosting rights to the 2004 European Athletics Indoor Cup by the European Athletic Association. Spain won the men's section of the team competition, while Russia took the top women's honours.

The competition comprised nineteen athletics events, ten for men and nine for women. The 400 metres races and medley relays were held in a dual final format, with finishing times determining the ultimate final rankings. The international team points totals were decided by their athletes' finishing positions, with each representative's performance contributing towards their national overall score.

Results summary

Men

Women

Medal table
Key

See also
2003 European Cup (athletics)

References

External links
European Indoor Cup. GBR Athletics/Athletics Weekly. Retrieved on 2011-01-23.
1st Indoor European Cup. Athletix (archived). Retrieved on 2011-01-23.
Timetable and results (archived)

2003 Indoor
European Indoor Cup
Sports competitions in Leipzig
International athletics competitions hosted by Germany
2003 in German sport
2000s in Saxony